Pilar Urbano Casaña (born 1940) is a Spanish journalist and writer.

Biography
Pilar Urbano was born in Valencia in 1940. She currently publishes her contributions in the newspaper El Mundo. She is also a numerary member of Opus Dei.

Print journalism

She has worked, as a political commentator, at the newspapers the ABC (until 1985, where she wrote a periodical column called "Hilo directo"), Ya (1985–1989), and now in El Mundo and the magazine Época.

In 1994, she was sued for expressing opinions characterized as homophobic in an Elle magazine article.

Radio and television

In 1988 she collaborated with Encarna Sánchez on her program  on Cadena COPE.

Books
Pilar Urbano has specialized in the publication of books on current affairs, including subjects such as the criminal plot of the September 11 attacks and the 23-F coup attempt in Spain. She was a direct witness to the latter, from the journalists' gallery of the Congress of Deputies. She was one of the people who remained standing. She later declared: "I had a submachine gun about a hand's breadth from my waist. I did not throw myself to the ground. That afternoon and that night I knew in a definite way that freedom is worth more than life."

She has also published two "authorized" biographies of Queen Sofía and Judge Baltasar Garzón.

In October 2008, the presentation of her book La Reina muy de cerca, published by Editorial Planeta, sparked strong controversy in Spain due to alleged statements by Queen Sofia against euthanasia, abortion, and same-sex marriage. This led to an official statement from the Royal Household in which it was said that Pilar Urbano, "after having a private conversation with Her Majesty the Queen, puts in Her Majesty's mouth alleged claims that some media reproduced today," which "do not correspond exactly to the opinions expressed by Her Majesty the Queen, as the author has been duly informed."

Before said statement, the journalist denied that the statements were of a private nature. "I have made a book with the Queen, knowing the Queen, not in the private sphere, but in the Zarzuela", adding that "what the queen has said is what appears in my book" and that the Royal House read and gave the book the "green light".

Works
 España cambia la piel: entrevistas políticas (1976)
 Con la venia, yo indagué el 23-F (1982)
 El hombre de Villa Tevere: los años romanos de Josemaría Escrivá (1995)
 Yo entré en el Cesid (1996)
 La Reina (1997)
 Garzón: el hombre que veía amanecer (2000)
 Jefe Atta: el secreto de la Casa Blanca, Plaza & Janés (2003)
 La madre del ajusticiado (2005)
 La Reina muy de cerca (2008)
 El precio del trono (2011)
  (2014)
 "Pieza 25, salvar a la infanta" (2017)

References

External links

 

1940 births
20th-century Spanish women writers
21st-century Spanish women writers
Living people
Opus Dei members
People from Valencia
Spanish political commentators
Spanish radio personalities
Spanish television journalists
Spanish women journalists
Women television journalists